Mela is a 2000 Indian masala film directed by Dharmesh Darshan. It stars  Aamir Khan, his brother Faisal Khan, and Twinkle Khanna. The film bombed upon release .

Plot

The only soldier brother called Ram Singh (Ayub Khan) of a young woman, Roopa (Twinkle Khanna), returns to Chandanpur village to arrange her marriage. A festival is arranged in the happiness of Roopa's marriage, however Chandanpur's happiness is short-lived, as the village is raided by a group of terrorists.  The leader of the terrorists, Gujjar, (Tinu Verma), murders a visiting politician, and to make matters worse, Roopa's beauty catches the eye of Gujjar.  However, as Gujjar attempts to escape with the terrified Roopa, Ram comes to her rescue, only to be slain, much to the horror of the village, especially Roopa.  Also, her best friend, Gopal (Master Om Kapoor), is killed too, much to the dismay of Gopal's mother (Tanvi Azmi) who tried to prevent her son from rescuing Roopa (due to his young age) which is what led Gujjar to kill him.  Roopa, enraged by the fact that Ram and Gopal are no more, vows vengeance.

Gujjar threatens Roopa that she will only be his mistress and will never be able to have a brother nor lover. Enraged, Roopa attempts to commit suicide by jumping into a waterfall as she finds it better to kill herself rather than be a mistress. Destiny has other plans as Roopa survives and she steals the clothes of Kishan (Aamir Khan), a theatre actor. Kishan works with his best friend, truck driver, Shankar (Faisal Khan). When Kishan meets Roopa for the first time, he is smitten by her beauty and falls in love with her.  Kishan decides to make Roopa the heroine of their dance show, however, Shankar warns him that Roopa will bring them in trouble.  With no option, Roopa travels with them, and she tries to escape, but returns when chased by the gang and Surendra Pratap Singh, a drunken policeman who was chosen by her brother as her fiancée but who tries to rape her. However, Roopa is saved by Shankar and Kishan. Roopa feigns love for Kishan, who wants to marry her, and the two men agree to help her return to Chandanpur. When Kishan is going to marry Roopa, who feels guilty over her betrayal, led, she tells them her story.

Shankar becomes her brother, while Kishan, heartbroken, leaves in disgust. Roopa and Shankar return to Chandanpur, where Shankar mobilises the village, attempting to set a trap for Gujjar who has learnt of Roopa's survival and terrorizes the village to find out her whereabouts. The trap backfires horribly until Kishan returns with a suspended cop Pakkad Singh (Johny Lever). The trap is re-set with another carnival and the villains' attack as planned. Roopa is kidnapped and Kishan and Shankar give chase and are captured and taken to Gujjar's hideout where they are forced to fight him and his men. Eventually with the arrival of Chandanpur's villagers, good prevails and the terrorists meet a gory end thanks to Kishan mortally wounding and killing Gujjar with Shankar and Roopa's help while the villagers kill Gujjar's men in the process. Roopa is united with her brother Shankar and her lover Kishan.

At the end Kishan and Roopa get married and while driving their truck, Shankar happens to meet Champakali (Aishwarya Rai) and Kishan and Roopa watch them.

Cast
 Aamir Khan as Kishan Pyare
 Twinkle Khanna as Roopa Singh (Radha)
 Faisal Khan as Shankar Shane
 Tinu Verma as Gujjar Singh, the main antagonist
 Ayub Khan (actor) as Ram Singh, Roopa's Brother 
 Johny Lever as Inspector Pakkad Singh/Inspector Pakoda Singh
 Navneet Nishan as Bulbul, the Post Woman
 Asrani as Banwari Baniya
 Tiku Talsania as Murari aka Mukhiya, Sarpanch 
 Kavi Kumar Azad as A Warning Watchman 
 Archana Puran Singh as Vidyavati, the Village Flirt
 Tanvi Azmi as Gopal's mom
 Parmeet Sethi as Surendra Pratap Singh (Special appearance)
 Kulbhushan Kharbanda as Mantri (Minister) (Special appearance)
 Aishwarya Rai as Champakali (Special appearance)
 Viju Khote as Patil Rao Singh
 Harish Patel as Seth Chandulal Popadlal
 Anirudh Agarwal as Kaali the bandit
 Veeru Krishnan as Ghungroo, the Dance Master
 Omkar Kapoor as Gopal, Roopa's Best friend (Special appearance)

Production
Karishma Kapoor, who had earlier collaborated with Dharmesh Darshan in the 1996 film Raja Hindustani, was first offered the female lead role but due to date issues, she declined the offer. Also, main role was offered to Sonali Bendre and Raveena Tandon. However, due to lack of dates, both actresses couldn't be a part of the movie. The role ultimately went to Twinkle Khanna. Darshan told in an interview that the 1971 film Caravan was an inspiration for Mela.

Aditya Pancholi was signed for villain's role but opted out as he did not want to be bare chested throughout the film.

Soundtrack
Aamir Khan, approached and persuaded A. R. Rahman to do compose music for the film, but due to time constraints, Rahman declined the offer.  The music was then composed by 4 composers, with Anu Malik, Rajesh Roshan, and Lesle Lewis composing the songs and Surinder Sodhi composing the film score.

The song placements in this movie were heavily criticised, particularly the excessive usage of the title track ‘Mela Dilon Ka’. The lyrics were also perceived to be inappropriate as they were paradoxical and contradictory in nature.

Track listing

Sify gave the album a 3/5 rating.

Reception
In her review for Rediff.com, Sharmila Taliculam called Aamir Khan the "saving grace" of the film and the "only one who does complete justice to his role". She found the film a mix of The Seven Samurai, Caravan and Sholay and praised Tinu Verma's acting labeling his portrayal of the villain, "convincingly menancing". She noted that dubbing Khanna's voice was a "gamble that ... misfired" and "[added] unnecessary drama and aggression to her role". I its 3-star review, Sify praised Aamir Khan's and Tinu Verma's performances and noted that Khanna "[tried] very hard to emote while shedding tears".

References

External links
 Mela at IMDb

2000 films
2000s Hindi-language films
Films scored by Rajesh Roshan
Films scored by Anu Malik
Films scored by Lesle Lewis
Indian action films
2000s masala films
Films scored by Surinder Sodhi
Films directed by Dharmesh Darshan
2000 action films